Citrus variegation virus (CVV) is a plant pathogenic virus, a member of subgroup 2 of ilarviruses in the family Bromoviridae, is the causal agent of infectious variegation, a disease occurring all over the world, causing problems for production especially in some susceptible varieties of lemon and mandarin.

References

External links 
 ICTVdB - The Universal Virus Database: Citrus variegation virus
 Family Groups - The Baltimore Method

Bromoviridae
Viral citrus diseases